Coleophora comata is a moth of the family Coleophoridae. It is found in Turkestan.

References

comata
Moths described in 1986
Moths of Asia